Sebastian Donadio (born ) is an Argentine male track cyclist, riding for the national team. He competed in the madison event at the 2010 and 2011 UCI Track Cycling World Championships.

References

External links
 Profile at cyclingarchives.com

1972 births
Living people
Argentine track cyclists
Argentine male cyclists
Place of birth missing (living people)
South American Games silver medalists for Argentina
South American Games medalists in cycling
Competitors at the 2010 South American Games